The Ministry of Tourism (translit. Misrad HaTayarut) is the Israeli government office responsible for tourism. The office was created in 1964, with Akiva Govrin being the first minister, but was appended to the Trade and Industry Ministry between 1977 and 1981. The logo for the Ministry depicts the Biblical Spies carrying fruit back from touring the Holy Land.

List of ministers
The Minister of Tourism (Sar HaTayarut) is the political head of the ministry and a member of the Israeli cabinet. Ehud Barak is the only Prime Minister to have held the position whilst serving as the Prime Minister, whilst Moshe Katsav, who was Minister of Tourism from 1996 to 1999, went on to become President. On one occasion there was a Deputy Minister of Tourism.

Deputy Ministers

See also
Tourism in Israel

References

External links

Minister of Tourism, Yoel Razvozov Knesset website

 
1964 establishments in Israel
Tourism
Ministry of Tourism
Tourism
Tourism in Israel
Israel